Rancho Santa Rita  was a  Mexican land grant in the Amador Valley and western Livermore Valley, which is in present day Alameda County, California.

It was given in 1839 by Governor Juan Alvarado to Jose Dolores Pacheco.

The rancho included present day Pleasanton, Asco, and Dougherty.

History

Rancho Santa Rita was granted in 1839 to Pueblo de San José alcalde Jose Dolores Pacheco. It extended east from present day Foothill Road, with the Rancho Las Positas adjacent in the eastern Livermore Valley, Rancho San Ramon on the north and the Rancho Valle de San Jose on the south,   Pacheco was an absentee landowner, but had a small adobe built in 1844, which is no longer standing. In 1854, Francisco Alviso, the son of Pacheco's majordomo (ranch manager), Francisco Solano Alviso, built the adobe ranch house that still stands on Foothill Road in the Alviso Adobe Community Park overlooking Amador Valley.

A claim for Rancho Santa Rita was filed with the Public Land Commission in 1852, and the grant was patented to John Yountz, administrator of the estate of José Dolores Pacheco in 1865.

In 1853, Rancho Santa Rita was sold to Augustin Alviso, grantee of Rancho Potrero de los Cerritos, by the heirs of Jose Delores Pacheco, Juana Pacheco and Salvio Pacheco.  In 1854, Samuel B. Martin and West J. Martin purchased Rancho Santa Rita. They sold the ranch in 1865, and moved to Oakland.

In 1865 William M. Mendenhall came to the valley, and in 1868 purchased  of the Rancho Santa Rita grant. During the period of the railroad boom in the late 1860s, Rancho Santa Rita was sub divided into fifteen farms. The larger land owners consisted of J.W. Dougherty, ; Abdijah Baker, ; and William Knox, .

In 1869 J.W. Kottinger and J.A. Neal each laid out and plotted a subdivision for a new town called Alisal, situated about five miles south of Dublin. By 1878 the village was an unincorporated town of about 500 people, later renamed Pleasanton.  Like Livermore, Pleasanton attained its size and importance with coming of the Union Pacific Railroad.

In the early 1880s, Count Valensin purchased , Maas Suders purchased a strip of land from the Mendenhall's , and Samuel Hewlett purchased .  In 1894 the remainder of Rancho Santa Rita was offered for sale by Lagrance and Company of Oakland.

In 1921 what was left of the Mexican grant was sold to Asa Mendenhall.

Historic sites of the Rancho
 Pacheco Adobe — the first adobe, built in 1844 by José Dolores Pacheco, is no longer standing. Its site is 0.5 miles (0.8 km) to the north of the Alviso Adobe. 
 Francisco Alviso Adobe —  built in 1854 by Francisco Alviso, the son of Pacheco's mayordomo (ranch manager), Francisco Solano Alviso. It is located within Alviso Adobe Community Park present day Pleasanton.
Alviso Adobe Community Park

See also

List of California Ranchos

References

External links
Diseño del Rancho Santa Rita : Alameda County, Calif. at The Bancroft Library

Santa Rita
Santa Rita
Amador Valley
Livermore Valley
Pleasanton, California
El Camino Viejo
Santa Rita